Ned Potter may refer to:

E. B. Potter, known as Ned
Ned Potter, tennis writer and coach, see World no. 1 women tennis players